Lake is an unincorporated community located in Ascension Parish, Louisiana, United States. Lake is located at latitude 30°17'59" north, longitude 90°51'10" west. Lake is located between Lake Martin and Lake 
Villar. The name originates from when the two lakes flooded, the entire community became a lake.

Unincorporated communities in Ascension Parish, Louisiana
Baton Rouge metropolitan area
Unincorporated communities in Louisiana